The Milwaukee Panthers are the athletic teams of the University of Wisconsin–Milwaukee. A total of 13 Panthers athletic teams compete in NCAA Division I. The Panthers have won the James J. McCafferty Trophy as the Horizon League's all-sports champions six times since 2000.

History
UWM's athletic teams are nicknamed the Panthers. UWM has had three mascots and nicknames: Green Gulls (1927–1956), Cardinals (1956–1964) and Panthers (1964–present). Before 1990, the university's athletics program spent the majority of its history at the NCAA Division III and II levels, as well as several years at the NAIA level. All non-Division I sports moved to the NCAA Division I level for the 1990–91 academic year.

From 1998 to 2007, the Milwaukee Panthers qualified for NCAA Tournaments at the team level a total of 24 times in six different sports, making Milwaukee the second most successful college athletic program in the state of Wisconsin (trailing only the Wisconsin Badgers of the Big Ten Conference).

The Panthers received national media attention with an appearance in the Sweet Sixteen of the 2005 Men's Basketball NCAA Tournament.  Other sports that Milwaukee competes in include baseball, women's volleyball, men's and women's cross-country, men's and women's Indoor and Outdoor Track and Field, men's and women's Swimming and Diving, and women's tennis.

In 1988, now retired Athletic Director Bud Haidet came to the school and quickly moved the program from NAIA to NCAA Division I. Milwaukee currently ranks 157th out of all 336 NCAA Division I schools in this year's NACDA Director's Cup standings conducted by the National Association of Collegiate Directors of Athletics. Formerly known as the Sears Directors' Cup, the annual contest awards points for NCAA post-season appearances and performances in all sports. Milwaukee, which won the McCafferty Trophy as the Horizon League's all-sports champion four of the last six years, ranks eighth in the nation among non-Division I-A programs and second among institutions that do not sponsor football at any level. The Panthers have earned 75 total points through the fall and are just 3 points behind North Carolina State University. Milwaukee currently sits tied with several schools, including the University of Missouri, and holds a 2-point lead on Northwestern University. After picking up 50 points in women's soccer (NCAA Tournament 2nd round) and 25 points in women's volleyball (NCAA Tournament 1st round) in the fall, Milwaukee looks to maintain its edge on cross-city rival Marquette University (91st place) and catch Horizon League leader Youngstown State (66th) this spring.

Teams
A member of the Horizon League, the University of Wisconsin-Milwaukee sponsors teams in seven men's and eight women's NCAA sanctioned sports:

Baseball 
As the only Division I college baseball team in the state of Wisconsin, the Milwaukee Panthers have seen much success, including posting six 30-win seasons in the last nine years. They have also qualified for three NCAA Tournaments since 1999, including a win over #1 ranked Rice in the first round of the 1999 NCAA Tournament.

Men's basketball 
The Milwaukee Panthers men's basketball team has flourished under the helm of Athletics Director Bud Haidet and his knack for finding successful head coaches. In 1999, Haidet hired then UW–Platteville head coach Bo Ryan. In Ryan's two seasons (99–00 and 00–01) he led Milwaukee to its first back-to-back winning seasons in eight years before accepting the head coaching position for the Wisconsin Badgers.

In 2001, Bruce Pearl was hired to replace Ryan and continue the success of the previous two seasons. It took Pearl only two seasons to take Milwaukee to its first ever "Big Dance" in March 2003, where the Panthers came only a missed buzzer-beater away from pulling off a come-from-behind "12–5 upset" over Notre Dame. Milwaukee lost, 70–69, and Notre Dame went on to advance to the Elite Eight in impressive fashion over fourth seeded Illinois. The following year, Pearl would lead Milwaukee to its first ever Division I postseason victory in men's basketball in the 2004 NIT with a crushing home victory over Rice, 91–53, at the U.S. Cellular Arena.

In March 2005, Milwaukee's men's basketball program entered the NCAA men's basketball tournament as the 12th Seed in the Midwest regional bracket. After ousting fifth-seeded Alabama in the first round and fourth-seeded Boston College (coach Bruce Pearl's alma mater) in the second round, Milwaukee entered for the first time ever the "Sweet 16". The Panthers would go on to lose to the top-seeded eventual tournament runner-up, Illinois, 77–63, in its Sweet Sixteen matchup. It was an Illinois team that included future NBA players Deron Williams, Dee Brown, James Augustine and Luther Head. In a bit of irony, The Illini's head coach, Bruce Weber beat his alma mater, Milwaukee, after Pearl did the same to Boston College a week earlier. Milwaukee's entrance into the Sweet Sixteen was due in part to Pearl's full court press playmaking style, what the Boston Globe would dub the "UWM Press". After their appearance in the NCAA Tournament, Bruce Pearl was hired by the University of Tennessee.

In March 2006, for the third time in four years, Milwaukee won the Horizon League Championship to enter the NCAA Tournament as an 11th Seed under first-year coach Rob Jeter. In the first round, the Panthers faced the sixth-seeded Oklahoma Sooners in Jacksonville, Florida, and won easily, 82–74. The Panthers never trailed against the Sooners, and led by as much as 14 late in the 2nd half. Milwaukee bowed out of the 2006 NCAA Tournament in the second round at the hands of the eventual National Champion Florida Gators.

Beginning with the 2007–08 season, Milwaukee Panthers basketball radio broadcasts moved to AM-1130 WISN, the former home of cross-town rival Marquette University. The move gives the Panthers the largest listening audience in the city of Milwaukee for their games. The Panthers were previously on 920 WOKY

The saying on the door of the locker room in the Klotsche Center reads "Take care of the little things." It was added in conjunction with the renovations of the men's basketball locker room at the Klotsche Center. It follows in the tradition of other university teams posting sayings on the way to the playing field, such as "Play like a champion today" at Notre Dame or "The Road to the Rose Bowl begins here" at the University of Wisconsin–Madison.

The men's basketball team plays at the UW–Milwaukee Panther Arena in downtown Milwaukee.  In February 2010, plans were announced to build an on-campus arena, or update the outdated Klotsche Center.  The Klotsche Center does not meet the Horizon League's 5000-seat minimum for men's basketball, and this would be among the issues to be fixed.  The proposed new arena would likely be in the slot of land currently owned by Columbia St. Mary's Hospital.  It is hoped that the proposed arena would bring up attendance, which has been limited especially for students because of the current off-campus facility.

For the 2012 season, with the contract to play at Arena expired, the Panthers played one season at the Klotsche Center, to help promote the viability of an on-campus arena. The move didn't work as the Panthers had a dismal season and it has been announced that the Panthers will return to the arena for the 2013–2014 season.

In 2014, UWM defied all odds by winning its first NCAA tournament bid since 2006 by winning the Horizon League tournament as the #5 seed. The Panthers, coming off a last place 8–24 season in 2012–2013, turned things around with clutch play down the stretch, defeating top seeded UW-Green Bay, and #3 seeded Wright State to capture the Horizon League's automatic bid.

In April 2014, UWM was handed a one-year postseason ban due to a low Academic Progress Rate.

Women's basketball 
After leading the Lady Panthers to their first regular-season title since 2001 and second NCAA Tournament appearance in school history, Milwaukee women's basketball coach Sandy Botham was named the 2006 Horizon League women's basketball coach of the year. Botham had been voted the league's top coach two times previously in her 10 years at Milwaukee. In 2012, Botham retired as the women's basketball coach and was replaced by Kyle Rechlicz.

Football 

Milwaukee's now-defunct football program competed at the NCAA College Division (now NCAA Division II) level; due to lack of funds and a long string of losing seasons, they dropped the sport after the 1974 season. A club team exists known as Milwaukee Panther Football.

Men's soccer 

The Milwaukee men's soccer team has a rich history of achievements in its 34 years as a Division I program. Milwaukee is regularly ranked in the top 25 of the country, and was as high as eighth in 2002. Milwaukee men's soccer began the 2006 season ranked 24th in the nation. Since first fielding a team in 1973, Milwaukee men's soccer has compiled an impressive all-time record of 396–223–53 and an all-time NCAA Tournament record of 4–7–1 in eight appearances. Milwaukee has won four of the past five Horizon League Tournament Championships and four of the past six regular season crowns, as well as qualified for five consecutive NCAA Tournaments (2001–2005). In the second round of both the 2004 and 2005 NCAA Tournament, Milwaukee fell to the #1 team in the nation in either double overtime (2004, #1 UC-Santa Barbara), or in a penalty kick shootout (2005, #1 New Mexico). Both those teams eventually advanced to play in each year's national championship game. On September 13, 2006, Milwaukee smashed their previous home attendance record by more than 30% as they hosted their first-ever night match under the newly installed lights at Engelmann Field on the Milwaukee campus. Milwaukee's come-from-behind victory over Marquette, 3–2, allowed them to retain possession of the coveted Milwaukee Cup, and moved their all-time (Division I) record vs their cross-city rival to 25–7–2. The standing-room only record crowd of 3,256 broke the Engelmann Field attendance record by over 1,000. The previous mark, set in 1990, had been 2,250 fans.

Women's soccer 
Milwaukee's women's soccer team has also been a regular at the NCAA Tournament in recent years, including advancing to the second round of the NCAA Tournament for the second consecutive year in 2006.  NWSL and former US Women's National Team forward Sarah Hagen is the most notable alumna.

Women's volleyball 
The women's volleyball team at Milwaukee has also enjoyed national success in recent years, qualifying for six of the last nine NCAA Tournaments and compiling an all-time record of 867–477–7 through the end of the 2006 season.

Club sports 
Club sports at Milwaukee include: men's ice hockey, men's lacrosse, wrestling, American football, men's volleyball, men's rugby union, women's rugby union, women's lacrosse, men's ultimate frisbee, women's ultimate frisbee, table tennis and water polo.

The Milwaukee men's rugby union team, for the first time since its creation in 1983, won a Midwest Conference Championship and advanced to the USA Rugby Division II National Tournament for the 2005–06 season. Having beaten the University of Illinois at Urbana–Champaign and Ohio University to qualify, the fourth-seeded Panthers competed in the 2006 USA Rugby Collegiate Championships. In 2007–2008 season the men's rugby club beat Purdue in pool play and went to the Division I playoffs for the first time since the club's creation in 1983. The women's rugby club made it to the Division II final the same year.

The Milwaukee Water Polo Club is Co-Ed and had its best finish in the 2019 Fall ACWPL Championships. They placed 4th after beating #3 Seed the University of Minnesota to advance to the 3rd place game where they would eventually lose to Harper college.

Athletic facilities 
UWM Panther Arena – men's basketball
Klotsche Center – men's and women's basketball, volleyball, swimming and diving, indoor track and field
Engelmann Stadium – men's and women's soccer
Franklin Field – baseball
River Glen Elite – women's tennis

Notable people

Baseball
 Daulton Varsho (only drafted player from UWM to see MLB service time; has accumulated 14 home runs and a batting average of .231 after playing outfield and catcher for the Arizona Diamondbacks through 2020 and 2021.

Basketball
 Clay Tucker (professional basketball player for Joventut Badalona in Liga ACB)
 Bruce Weber (men's basketball head coach at the Kansas State University)
 Von McDade (retired professional basketball player, he was drafted by the New Jersey Nets in the 2nd round of the 1991 NBA Draft)
 Dylan Page, (professional basketball player for Chorale Roanne Basket)
 Joah Tucker
 Chris Hill
 Ed McCants

Football
Bill Carollo (American football official in the National Football League (NFL) since 1989)
Mike Reinfeldt (All-Pro Safety for the Houston Oilers of the NFL, played 8 seasons from 1976 to 1983 and General Manager of the NFL's Tennessee Titans)
 Demetrius Harris current Arizona Cardinals Tight End, formerly with the Chiefs, Browns and Bears.

Soccer
Jimmy Banks (Former Milwaukee Wave defender from 1987 to 1993 and US National team member from 1986 to 1991)
Sasho Cirovski (Soccer coach of the University of Maryland, College Park)
Tighe Dombrowski (full back and winger for IK Sirius of the Swedish Superettanan)
Sarah Hagen (forward, United States women's national under-23 soccer team and FC Bayern Munich of the German Bundesliga) 
Manny Lagos (former MLS player from 1997 to 2005 and former US National team member)
Tony Sanneh (former midfielder and defender, MLS and Bundesliga player and US National team member)

Notable coaches 
Sandy Botham
Bob Gansler
Bruce Pearl
Bo Ryan
Brian Tompkins
Rob Jeter
Jerry Augustine
Louis Bennett

Athletic directors
 Herman Kluge (1956–1970)
 Albert Negratti (1970–1971)
 Thomas P. Rosandich (1972–1975)
 Jim Harding (1975–1980)
 Daniel I. Harris (associate director for Men's Athletics, 1980–1983)
 Daryl A. Leonard (associate director for Women's Athletics, 1980–1983)
 Daniel I. Harris (1983–1988)
 Bud Haidet (1988–2009)
 George Koonce (2009–2010)
 Dave Gilbert (interim, 2010)
 Rick Costello (2010–2012)
 Andy Geiger (interim, 2012–2013)
 Amanda Braun (2013–present)

McCafferty Trophy

See also
 List of historical records of the Milwaukee Panthers
List of college athletic programs in Wisconsin

References

External links